The Minister of Health and Social Services (in French: Ministère de la Santé et des Services sociaux) is responsible for the administration of health and social services in the province of Quebec since June 1985. The Minister of Social Affairs was previously responsible for this duty.

Ministers

External links
Official site

Health
Medical and health organizations based in Quebec
Quebec
Quebec